Yuriy Tkachuk may refer to

 Yuriy Tkachuk (footballer born 1995)
 Yuriy Tkachuk (footballer born 1989)